Gabryszak is a surname of Polish origin. Notable people with the surname include:
 Dennis Gabryszak (born 1951), American politician
 Elżbieta Gabryszak (born 1998), Polish figure skater
 Kimber Gabryszak (born 1980), American skeleton racer

Polish-language surnames